This is a list of schools in the London Borough of Hillingdon, England.

State-funded schools

Primary schools
Source.

Belmore Primary Academy, Hayes
Bishop Winnington-Ingram CE Primary School, Ruislip
Botwell House RC Primary School, Hayes
Bourne Primary School, Ruislip
The Breakspear School, Ickenham
Brookside Primary School, Hayes
Charville Academy, Hayes
Cherry Lane Primary School, West Drayton
Colham Manor Primary School, Hillingdon
Coteford Infant School, Pinner
Coteford Junior School, Pinner
Cowley St Laurence CE Primary School, Cowley
Cranford Park Academy, Harlington
Deanesfield Primary School, South Ruislip
Dr Tripletts CE Primary School, Hayes
Field End Infant School, Ruislip
Field End Junior School, Ruislip
Frithwood Primary School, Northwood
Glebe Primary School, Ickenham
Grange Park Infant School, Hayes
Grange Park Junior School, Hayes
Guru Nanak Sikh Academy, Hayes
Harefield Infant School, Harefield
Harefield Junior School, Harefield
Harlyn Primary School, Pinner
Harmondsworth Primary School, Harmondsworth
Hayes Park School, Hayes
Heathrow Primary School, Sipson
Hermitage Primary School, Uxbridge
Hewens Primary School, Hayes
Highfield Primary School, Hillingdon
Hillingdon Primary School, Hillingdon
Hillside Infant School, Northwood
Hillside Junior School, Northwood
Holy Trinity CE School, Northwood
John Locke Academy, Uxbridge
Lake Farm Park Academy, Hayes
Lady Bankes Primary School, Ruislip
Laurel Lane Primary School, West Drayton
Minet Infants School, Hayes
Minet Junior School, Hayes
Nanaksar Primary School, Hillingdon
Newnham Infant School, Ruislip
Newnham Junior School, Ruislip
Oak Farm Primary School, Hillingdon
Pinkwell Primary School, Hayes
Rabbsfarm Primary School, Yiewsley
Rosedale Primary School, Hayes
Ruislip Gardens Primary School, Ruislip
Ryefield Primary School, Hillingdon
Sacred Heart RC Primary School, Ruislip
St Andrew's CE Primary School, Uxbridge
St Bernadette RC Primary School, Hillingdon
St Catherine RC Primary School, West Drayton
St Martin's CE Primary School, West Drayton
St Mary's RC Primary School, Uxbridge
St Matthew's CE Primary School, Yiewsley
St Swithun Wells RC Primary School, Ruislip
Warrender Primary School, Ruislip
West Drayton Academy, West Drayton
Whitehall Infant School, Uxbridge
Whitehall Junior School, Uxbridge
Whiteheath Infant School, Ruislip
Whiteheath Junior School, Ruislip
William Byrd Primary Academy, Harlington
Wood End Park Academy, Hayes
Yeading Infant School, Hayes
Yeading Junior School, Hayes

Secondary schools
Source

Barnhill Community High School, Hayes
Bishop Ramsey CE School, Ruislip
Bishopshalt School, Hillingdon
De Salis Studio College, Hayes
The Douay Martyrs RC School, Ickenham
Global Academy, Hayes
Guru Nanak Sikh Academy, Hayes
Harefield Academy, Harefield
Harlington School, Hayes
Haydon School, Northwood
Hewens College, Hayes End
Northwood School, Northwood
Oak Wood School, Uxbridge
Park Academy West London, Hillingdon
Parkside Studio College, Hayes
Queensmead School, South Ruislip
Rosedale College, Hayes
Ruislip High School, Ruislip Manor
Swakeleys School for Girls, Hillingdon
UTC Heathrow, Northwood
Uxbridge High School, Uxbridge
Vyners School, Ickenham

Special and alternative schools 
SourceSpecial Secondary schools (London Borough of Hillingdon) accessed 22 April 2011

Grangewood School, Eastcote
Hedgewood School, Hayes
Meadow High School, Hillingdon
Moorcroft School, Hillingdon
Pentland Field School, Ickenham
The Pride Academy, Yiewsley
The Skills Hub, Yiewsley
The Willows School, Hayes
The Young People's Academy, Yiewsley

Further education 
Uxbridge College, Uxbridge and Hayes

Independent schools

Primary and preparatory schools
The Hall School, Northwood
St Helen's College, Hillingdon
St John's School, Northwood
St Martin's School, Northwood

Senior and all-through schools
ACS Hillingdon, Hillingdon
Lady Nafisa School, West Drayton
Northwood College, Northwood
St Helen's School, Northwood

Special and alternative schools
Hillingdon Manor School, Hillingdon
Pield Heath House RC School, Uxbridge

References

External links
 London Borough of Hillingdon - Primary schools
 London Borough of Hillingdon - Secondary schools

Hillingdon
Schools in the London Borough of Hillingdon